Austin Peak is a peak in the east-central portion of the Mirabito Range in Victoria Land, Antarctica. The geographical feature was so named by the northern party of the New Zealand Geological Survey Antarctic Expedition, 1963–64, for William T. Austin, United States Antarctic Research Program Representative at McMurdo Station, 1963–64, who organized support for the New Zealand field parties. The peak lies on the Pennell Coast, a minor portion of Antarctica lying between Cape Williams and Cape Adare.

References
 

Mountains of Victoria Land
Pennell Coast